Tiffany Lynn van Soest (born March 20, 1989) is an American Muay Thai kickboxer who competes in the bantamweight division. She is the current Glory Super Bantamweight Champion. In 2019, Combat Press voted her the Female Fighter of the Year.

Originally a Shōrin-ryū karate practitioner, van Soest began Muay Thai at the age of eighteen and was both a state and national titlist as an amateur before turning professional in 2011.

Early life
Tiffany van Soest was born in Torrance, California, and raised in Riverside, California. Her paternal grandfather was a Dutch-Indonesian born in Semarang, in the former Dutch East Indies. He immigrated to the Netherlands in the early 1950s and met his ethnically Dutch wife in the Hague, after which they both moved to the United States. Van Soest is of maternal Austrian and Polish descent. The first sports she became involved in were soccer at the age of five and later Shōrin-ryū karate at eight. She earned the rank of second degree black belt under Joey Pagliuso at the United States Karate Organization at seventeen, but was unable to compete until she was eighteen because her parents wouldn't let her. When she did start competitive karate, she took multiple titles at state, national and world levels.

Van Soest stopped practicing martial arts for a short time to attend California State University San Marcos where she earned a bachelor's degree in kinesiology, and played on the soccer team for two seasons. However, van Soest was soon drawn back to martial arts and found Muay Thai while living in San Diego, California.

Muay Thai and kickboxing career

Amateur career
Tifffany Van Soest began fighting in amateur Muay Thai in 2009 and had her first title fight on August 14, 2010, at the San Mateo Event Center in San Mateo, California, challenging IKF Women's Amateur World Muay Thai Bantamweight (55.45 kg/122.2 lb) Champion Jenna Castillo for her belt. After what was called the "Fight of the Night", van Soest lost the challenge to Castillo by unanimous decision on scores of 50–44, 49–45 and 49–45. She soon captured the United States Muay Thai Association Women's Amateur California Featherweight Championship and then defeated Gabriela Lemus by technical knockout (TKO) in the second round of their contest in Pala, California on October 2, 2010, to claim the International Amateur Muay Thai Federation Women's United States Featherweight title. Her original opponent was to be Tandi Schaffer, but Schafer injured her hand in a previous bout and was forced to withdraw. Facing her first foreign opponent, van Soest fought to a draw with China's Cong Wang in Las Vegas, Nevada, on November 16, 2010.

She debuted as an amateur in mixed martial arts (MMA) on February 26, 2011, at the Road to WCK event in Pala where she TKO'd Kate McGray with a combination of a left high kick and standing-to-ground punches early in the second round. She had her first international bout in her second appearance in amateur MMA as she lost to Jin Tang via submission due to a triangle choke inside the first round in Nanning, China, on June 18, 2011. The fight is notable for being the first female MMA match to be held in mainland China.

Lion Fight

Early career
After amassing a record of 10–1–1 as an amateur nak muay, Van Soest turned professional on October 22, 2011, and was initially set to rematch Cong Wang in her pro debut in Las Vegas. However, Wang was unable to compete and replaced by four-time world champion Lena Ovchynnikova. Van Soest won by TKO after Ovchynnikova retired in her corner with a broken hand at the end of round two. The pair were scheduled to rematch on July 21, 2012, in Croatia, but it never came to fruition. In her sophomore appearance as a pro, van Soest defeated Vivian Leung by unanimous decision at Lion Fight: Battle in the Desert 5 in Las Vegas on February 25, 2012. She then followed this up with another unanimous points victory over Heidi Otterbein at Lion Fight 6 on May 12, 2012.

In just her fourth outing as a pro, she was given the chance to fight for the vacant International Karate and Kickboxing Council Women's World Super Bantamweight Muay Thai Championship on August 18, 2012, in Pala. Facing Jemyma Betrian after her original foe Hilary Mack pulled out, van Soest and her Dutch-based Curaçaoan opponent put on a back-and-forth "Fight of the Night" display. Van Soest scored a knockdown with a spinning back fist in the second round, and Betrian was docked a point in the third for rabbit punching. Despite this, two judges scored the bout a draw and the other in the favour of van Soest, rendering the match a majority draw.

On October 13, 2012, van Soest took the WBC Muaythai Women's International Super Bantamweight (55.338 kg/122 lb) title from the previously undefeated Jeri Sitzes at Lion Fight 7 in Las Vegas. After a slow first two rounds, she began taking the lead in the third, scoring with low kicks and punches to take the unanimous decision. Having already fought three times for the organization, she then signed a multi-fight contract with Lion Fight Promotions the following month.

In the co-main event of Lion Fight 8, the promotion's first event televised nationally, she faced Alexis Rufus on January 25, 2013. It was a closely contested affair up until round four when van Soest rocked Rufus with a high kick before dropping her for good with a right hand. Van Soest was again in the co-main event at Lion Fight 9 on March 15, 2013, as she took a wide unanimous decision over Natalie Yip, who was debuting as a professional.

First featherweight title reign
Van Soest had no trouble defeating Lucy Payne in a bout for the inaugural Lion Fight Women's Featherweight (56.7 kg/125 lb) Championship at Lion Fight 10 in Las Vegas on July 26, 2013. Despite giving up the height and reach advantage, she was able to get inside and hurt Payne, cornering the Englishwoman while landing a flurry of punches and elbows. Payne dropped to a knee, forcing the referee to step in and halt the bout and give Soest the TKO win in round one.

In a non-title affair at Lion Fight 12 in Las Vegas on November 1, 2013, van Soest completely outclassed Magali Foroni. The Frenchwoman offered little to no offense for two rounds until her corner threw in the towel midway through the third. Van Soest lost her Lion Fight title at her first attempted defence, losing to Caley Reece in the Lion Fight 13 headliner on February 7, 2014. Although it was a close fight, Reece's use of the clinch and sweeps saw her take a split decision and hand van Soest her first professional defeat.

Van Soest rematched Lucy Payne on March 23, 2014, at Lion Fight 15, which was held in Ledyard, Connecticut. It was the promotion's first card outside Las Vegas. Van Soest used chopping low kicks to slow Payne's movement en route to winning a unanimous decision. Van Soest defeated Sindy Huyer via TKO fifty-six seconds into round five at Lion Fight 16 in Las Vegas on July 4, 2014. Referee Junichiro Kamijo stopped the bout after van Soest landed a front kick to Huyer's face, which broke Huyer's nose, quickly followed with a left hook to the jaw. After a failed excursion into kickboxing, which saw her challenge and lose to the Enfusion 57 kg champion Denise Kielholtz by unanimous decision, van Soest was booked to face Chajmaa Bellakhal at Lion Fight 21 on March 27, 2015. She won the fight by unanimous decision.

Second featherweight title reign
Her 3–0 run with the promotion earned van Soeast the right to challenge Bernise Alldis for the Lion Fight Women's Featherweight (56.7 kg/125 lb) Championship at Lion Fight 22 on May 22, 2015. She won the fight by a fourth-round technical knockout. The bout was stopped by the ringside physician due to a massive gash across Alldis' right cheek. van Soest made her fist title defense against Poland's Martyna Krol at Lion Fight 23 on July 31, 2015. She retained the title by unanimous decision. After successfully making the first defense of her featherweight title, van Soest moved down a weight class in order to face Ashley Nichols for the vacant Lion Fight Women's Super Bantamweight (54.4 kg/120 lb) Championship at Lion Fight 27 on January 29, 2016. She won the fight by unanimous decision. van Soest complained of not having received payment from the organization following the fight, which was later clarified by Lion Fight, who stated: "There was an issue when the check was deposited and this morning, payment was wired to her account to resolve the matter".

Glory

First super bantamweight title reign
On April 6, 2016, it was announced that van Soest had signed with Glory and would compete in their super bantamweight division. Immediately after signing with the promotion, van Soest was placed in the 2016 Glory Super Bantamweight Tournament, which happened across two different events, with the semifinals and finals taking place on the same day. van Soest faced Esma Hasshass in the quarterfinals at Glory 30: Los Angeles on May 13, 2016. She won her promotional debut by unanimous decision. van Soest faced Jessica Gladstone in the penultimate bout of the tournament at Glory 36: Oberhausen on December 10, 2016. She her second fight with Glory by unanimous decision as well. Advancing to the finals, van Soest faced the ISKA and WKN World champion Amel Dehby. She captured the Glory Women's Super Bantamweight Championship by unanimous decision, after winning her second fight of the day by unanimous decision. Winning this tournament earned van Soest the 2016 Glory "Newcomer of the Year" award.

van Soest made her first Glory title defense against the former WLF 55 kg champion Meryem Uslu at Glory 44: Chicago on August 25, 2017. Uslu stepped in as a replacement for Funda Alkayiş. van Soest won the fight by a fourth-round technical knockout, her first stoppage win with the promotion. van Soest made her second title defense against the former ISKA, WAKO and Kunlun Fight champion Anissa Meksen at Glory 48: New York on December 1, 2017. She lost her title by unanimous decision, with scores of 49–46, 49–46, 48–47.

Second super bantamweight title reign
van Soest faced Sofia Olofsson at Glory 55: New York on July 20, 2018. She won the fight by split decision. This victory earned van Soest to face Anissa Meksen in a rematch for the Glory Women's Super Bantamweight Championship at Glory 64: Strasbourg on March 9, 2019. Meksen won the fight by split decision.

Despite having lost to Anissa Meksen twice, the close nature of their second meeting was enough for Glory to book a trilogy match at Glory 71: Chicago on November 22, 2019. van Soest regained the title after winning the fight by unanimous decision, with scores of 48–47, 48–47, 49–46. van Soest made the first defense of her second reign against Aline Pereira at Glory 77: Rotterdam on January 30, 2021. She won the fight by unanimous decision. van Soest made her second title defense against Manazo Kobayashi at Glory 80 on March 19, 2022. She won the fight by a fifth-round technical knockout. van Soest was booked to make her third title defense against the WAKO-Pro World 56 kg champion Sarah Moussaddak at Glory: Collision 4 on October 8, 2022. She retained the title by a controversial unanimous decision.

Mixed martial arts career 
Van Soest made her Invicta  debut on September 23, 2016, against Kalyn Schwartz at Invicta FC 19: Maia vs. Modafferi. She lost the fight via rear-naked choke on round two.

Her next fight came on May 20, 2017, facing Christine Ferea at Invicta FC 23: Porto vs. Niedźwiedź.  She won the fight via unanimous decision.

Championships and awards

Karate 
United States Karate Organization
USKA California Championship
USKA United States Championship
USKA World Championship

Kickboxing / Muay Thai
CombatPress.com
 2019 Female Fighter of the Year 
AwakeningFighters.com
2015 KO/TKO of the Year vs. Bernise Alldis
2013 Personality of the Year
2013 KO/TKO of the Year vs. Alexis Rufus
International Amateur Muay Thai Federation
IAMTF Women's United States Featherweight Championship
Lion Fight
Lion Fight Women's Featherweight (56.7 kg/125 lb) Championship
Muay Thai Authority
2013 North American Female Fighter of the Year
2012 North American Breakthrough Fighter of the Year
United States Muay Thai Association
USMTA Women's Amateur California Featherweight Championship
World Boxing Council Muaythai
WBC Muaythai Women's International Super Bantamweight (55.338 kg/122 lb) Championship
Glory
Glory Women's Super Bantamweight (55.38 kg/122 lb) Championship (Two times, current)
Three successful title defenses
 2016 Glory "Newcomer of the Year" Award

Kickboxing record

|-  style="background:#cfc"
| 2022-10-08 || Win ||align=left| Sarah Moussaddak || Glory: Collision 4 || Arnhem, Netherlands || Decision (Unanimous) || 5 || 3:00 || 25–6–2
|-
! style=background:white colspan=9 |
|-
|-  style="background:#cfc"
| 2022-03-19 || Win ||align=left| Manazo Kobayashi || Glory 80 || Hasselt, Belgium || TKO (Spinning back kick)|| 5 ||2:56 ||24–6–2
|-
! style=background:white colspan=9 |

|- style="background:#cfc;"
| 2021-01-30 || Win ||align=left| Aline Pereira || Glory 77: Rotterdam || Rotterdam, Netherlands || Decision (unanimous) || 5 || 3:00 || 23–6–2
|-
! style=background:white colspan=9 |
|- style="background:#cfc;"
| 2019-11-22 || Win ||align=left| Anissa Meksen || Glory 71: Chicago || Chicago, Illinois || Decision (unanimous) || 5 || 3:00 || 22–6–2
|-
! style=background:white colspan=9 |
|- style="background:#fbb;"
| 2019-03-09 || Loss ||align=left| Anissa Meksen || Glory 64: Strasbourg || Strasbourg, France || Decision (split) || 5 || 3:00 || 21–6–2
|-
! style=background:white colspan=9 |
|-
|- style="background:#cfc;"
| 2018-07-20 || Win ||align=left| Sofia Olofsson || Glory 55: New York || New York City, New York || Decision (split) || 3 || 3:00 || 21–5–2   
|-
|- style="background:#fbb;"
| 2017-12-01 || Loss ||align=left| Anissa Meksen || Glory 48: New York || New York City, New York || Decision (unanimous) || 5 || 3:00 || 20–5–2
|-
! style=background:white colspan=9 |
|-
|- style="background:#cfc;"
| 2017-08-25 || Win ||align=left| Meryem Uslu || Glory 44: Chicago || Hoffman Estates, Illinois || TKO (punches) || 4 || 0:36 || 20–4–2   
|-
! style=background:white colspan=9 |
|-
|- style="background:#cfc;"
| 2016-12-10 || Win ||align=left| Amel Dehby || Glory 36: Oberhausen, Final || Oberhausen, Germany || Decision (unanimous) || 3 || 3:00 || 19–4–2  
|-
! style=background:white colspan=9 |
|- 
|- style="background:#cfc;"
| 2016-12-10 || Win ||align=left| Jessica Gladstone || Glory 36: Oberhausen, Semi Finals || Oberhausen, Germany || Decision (unanimous) || 3 || 3:00 || 18–4–2   
|- style="background:#cfc;"
| 2016-05-13 || Win ||align=left| Esma Hasshass || Glory 30: Los Angeles, Quarter Finals || Ontario, California, USA || Decision (unanimous) || 3 || 3:00 || 17–4–2
|- style="background:#cfc;"
| 2016-01-29 || Win ||align=left| Ashley Nichols || Lion Fight 27 || Temecula, California, USA || Decision (unanimous) || 5 || 3:00 || 16–4–2
|-
! style=background:white colspan=9 |
|- style="background:#cfc;"
| 2015-07-31 || Win ||align=left| Martyna Krol || Lion Fight 23 || Temecula, California, USA || Decision (Unanimous) || 5 || 3:00 || 15–4–2
|-
! style=background:white colspan=9 |
|- style="background:#cfc;"
| 2015-05-22 || Win ||align=left| Bernise Alldis || Lion Fight 22 || Henderson, Nevada, USA || TKO (stoppage due to cut) || 4 || 1:44 || 14–4–2
|-
! style=background:white colspan=9 |
|- style="background:#cfc;"
| 2015-03-27 || Win ||align=left| Chajmaa Bellakhal || Lion Fight 21 || Temecula, California, USA || Decision (unanimous) || 5 || 3:00 || 13–4–2
|- style="background:#fbb;"
| 2014-11-23 || Loss ||align=left| Denise Kielholtz || Enfusion Live 22 || Groningen, Netherlands || Decision (unanimous) || 5 || 3:00 || 12–4–2
|-
! style=background:white colspan=9 |
|- style="background:#cfc;"
| 2014-07-04 || Win ||align=left| Sindy Huyer || Lion Fight 16 || Las Vegas, Nevada, USA || TKO (left front kick) || 5 || 0:56 || 12–3–2
|- style="background:#cfc;"
| 2014-05-23 || Win ||align=left| Lucy Payne || Lion Fight 15 || Ledyard, Connecticut, USA || Decision (unanimous) || 5 || 3:00 || 11–3–2
|- style="background:#fbb;"
| 2014-02-07 || Loss ||align=left| Caley Reece || Lion Fight 13 || Las Vegas, Nevada, USA || Decision (split) || 5 || 3:00 || 10–3–2
|-
! style=background:white colspan=9 |
|- style="background:#cfc;"
| 2013-11-01 || Win ||align=left| Magali Foroni || Lion Fight 12 || Las Vegas, Nevada, USA || TKO (corner stoppage) || 3 || 2:15 || 10–2–2
|-
! style=background:white colspan=9 |
|- style="background:#cfc;"
| 2013-07-26 || Win ||align=left| Lucy Payne || Lion Fight 10 || Las Vegas, Nevada, USA || TKO (punches and elbows) || 1 || 2:30 || 9–2–2
|-
! style=background:white colspan=9 |
|- style="background:#cfc;"
| 2013-03-15 || Win ||align=left| Natalie Yip || Lion Fight 9 || Las Vegas, Nevada, USA || Decision (unanimous) || 5 || 3:00 || 8–2–2
|- style="background:#cfc;"
| 2013-01-25 || Win ||align=left| Alexis Rufus || Lion Fight 8 || Las Vegas, Nevada, USA || KO (left high kick and punches) || 4 || 2:05 || 7–2–2
|- style="background:#cfc;"
| 2012-10-13 || Win ||align=left| Jeri Sitzes || Lion Fight 7 || Las Vegas, Nevada, USA || Decision (unanimous) || 5 || 3:00 || 6–2–2
|-
! style=background:white colspan=9 |
|- style="background:#c5d2ea;"
| 2012-08-18 || Draw ||align=left| Jemyma Betrian || WCK Muay Thai: Nakamoto vs. Kitchen || Pala, California, USA || Draw (majority) || 5 || 3:00 || 5–2–2
|-
! style=background:white colspan=9 |
|- style="background:#cfc;"
| 2012-05-12 || Win ||align=left| Heidi Otterbein || Lion Fight 6 || Las Vegas, Nevada, USA || Decision (unanimous) || 5 || 3:00 || 5–2–1
|- style="background:#cfc;"
| 2012-02-25 || Win ||align=left| Vivian Leung || Lion Fight: Battle in the Desert 5 || Las Vegas, Nevada, USA || Decision (unanimous) || 5 || 3:00 || 4–2–1
|- style="background:#cfc;"
| 2011-10-22 || Win ||align=left| Lena Ovchynnikova || WCK Muay Thai || Las Vegas, Nevada, USA || TKO (broken hand) || 2 || 3:00 || 3–2–1
|- style="background:#c5d2ea;"
| 2010-11-13 || Draw ||align=left| Wang Cong || Wu Lin Feng: Las Vegas Spectacular || Las Vegas, Nevada, USA || Draw (majority) || 3 || 3:00
|2–2–1
|- style="background:#cfc;"
| 2010-10-02 || Win ||align=left| Gabriela Lemus || WCK Muay Thai || Pala, California, USA || TKO || 2 ||
|2–2
|-
! style=background:white colspan=9 |
|- style="background:#fbb;"
| 2010-08-14 || Loss ||align=left| Jenna Castillo || Fight Night at the Mansion || San Mateo, California, USA || Decision (unanimous) || 5 ||
|1–2
|-
! style=background:white colspan=9 |
|-
|- style="background:#fbb;"
| 2010-01-02 || Loss ||align=left| Gong Yanli || Wu Lin Feng: China vs USA || Zhengzhou, China || Decision (unanimous) || 3 || 2:00
|1–1
|-
|- style="background:#cfc;"
| 2009-11-20 || Win ||align=left| Malia Spanyol || Battle of the Champions || San Diego, California, USA || || ||
|1–0
|-
| colspan=9  | Legend:    
|-

Mixed martial arts record

|-
| Win
| align=center| 1–2
| Christine Ferea
| Decision (unanimous)
|Invicta FC 23: Porto vs. Niedźwiedź
| 
| align=center| 3
| align=center| 5:00
| Kansas City, Missouri
| 
|-
| Loss
| align=center| 0–2
| Kalyn Schwartz
| Submission (rear-naked choke)
|Invicta FC 19: Maia vs. Modafferi
| 
| align=center| 2
| align=center| 2:08
| Kansas City, Missouri
|
|-
| Loss
| align=center| 0–1
| Jin Tang
| Submission (triangle choke)
| WBC Muay Thai - MMA in China
| 
| align=center| 1
| align=center| 2:25
| Nanning, Guangxi, China
|

See also
 List of female kickboxers

References

External links
 Official Website
 Tiffany van Soest at Awakening Fighters
 Official Lion Fight profile
 Official Glory profile
 

1989 births
Living people
American female kickboxers
Kickboxers from California
Flyweight kickboxers
Bantamweight kickboxers
American female karateka
Mixed martial artists utilizing Shōrin-ryū
Mixed martial artists utilizing Muay Thai
American Muay Thai practitioners
Female Muay Thai practitioners
Sportspeople from Torrance, California
Sportspeople from Riverside, California
Sportspeople from San Diego
American people of Austrian descent
American people of Dutch descent
American people of Dutch-Indonesian descent
American people of Polish descent
California State University, San Marcos alumni
American female mixed martial artists
Mixed martial artists from California
Featherweight kickboxers
Strawweight mixed martial artists
Glory kickboxers
American expatriate sportspeople in the Netherlands
21st-century American women